is a Japanese swimmer, described as "one of the world’s best Paralympic athletes" by the International Paralympic Committee. Japan Today has described her as a "swimming sensation perhaps as great as the Thorpedo but whose name few know". She has won 15 gold medals at the Paralympics, and 20 total.

Narita has used a wheelchair because of myelitis since the age of 13; in 1994, additionally, she was involved in a traffic accident which left her quadriplegic. In 1996, she represented Japan at the Paralympic Games in Atlanta, where she won two gold medals, two silver and one bronze. At the 2000 Summer Paralympics in Sydney, she won six gold medals. She also set five world records at the Sydney Games.

Narita competed again at the 2004 Summer Paralympics in Athens, and was the Games' most successful athlete, of any nationality and in any sport. She set six world records, seven Paralympic records, and won seven gold medals and one bronze medal.

In 2005, she was given the Best Female Athlete award by the International Paralympic Committee, the Best Male Athlete award going to Brazil's Clodoaldo Silva.

Narita is currently vice chair of the Tokyo 2016 Athletes' Commission.

See also
Athletes with most gold medals in one event at the Paralympic Games

References

External links
 

1970 births
Living people
People from Kawasaki, Kanagawa
Swimmers at the 1996 Summer Paralympics
Swimmers at the 2000 Summer Paralympics
Swimmers at the 2004 Summer Paralympics
Paralympic swimmers of Japan
Paralympic gold medalists for Japan
Paralympic silver medalists for Japan
Paralympic bronze medalists for Japan
World record holders in paralympic swimming
Medalists at the 1996 Summer Paralympics
Medalists at the 2000 Summer Paralympics
Medalists at the 2004 Summer Paralympics
Paralympic Sport Awards — Best Female winners
Paralympic medalists in swimming
Japanese female freestyle swimmers
Japanese female backstroke swimmers
Japanese female breaststroke swimmers
Japanese female butterfly swimmers
Japanese female medley swimmers
S4-classified Paralympic swimmers
S5-classified Paralympic swimmers
20th-century Japanese women
21st-century Japanese women
Medalists at the 2018 Asian Para Games